CBVB may refer to:

 CBVB-FM, a radio rebroadcaster (103.7 FM) licensed to Chandler, Quebec, Canada, rebroadcasting CBVE-FM
 CBVB-TV, a television retransmitter (channel 23) licensed to Chandler, Quebec, Canada, retransmitting CBMT